Skrugar Point is a peninsula in Qikiqtaaluk Region, Nunavut, Canada.

References
 Atlas of Canada

Peninsulas of Qikiqtaaluk Region
Sverdrup Islands